Thomas (or Tom) O'Donnell may refer to:
 Tom O'Donnell (politician) (1926–2020), Irish Fine Gael TD and MEP
 Thomas O'Donnell (Irish nationalist politician) (1871–1943), Irish nationalist MP
 Thomas O'Donnell (Sinn Féin politician) (died 1945), Irish Sinn Féin represented Sligo-Mayo East in the 1920s
 Thomas A. O'Donnell (1870–1945), oil industrialist and builder of the O'Donnell Golf Club in Palm Springs, California
 Thomas E. O'Donnell (draft opponent) (1841–c. 1875), powerful force in New York draft riots
 Thomas E. O'Donnell (judge) (born 1954), Irish judge
 Tom O'Donnell (physician) (1926–2014), New Zealand medical doctor
 Tom O'Donnell (cricketer) (born 1996), Australian cricketer